An All-Arena Team, consisting of the best players of their position is selected every season in the Arena Football League (AFL).

Teams

 1987
 1988
 1989
 1990
 1991
 1992
 1993
 1994
 1995
 1996
 1997
 1998
 1999
 2000
 2001
 2002
 2003
 2004
 2005
 2006
 2007
 2008
 2010
 2011 
 2012 
 2013 
 2014
 2015
 2016
 2017
 2018

References